WRXY-TV (channel 49) is a religious television station licensed to Tice, Florida, United States, serving the Fort Myers–Naples area as an owned-and-operated station of the Christian Television Network (CTN). The station's studios and transmitter are located on Horseshoe Road in Punta Gorda, near the Babcock Ranch planned community. WRXY-TV is branded as CTN 10, in reference to its channel position on most cable systems in the market.

History

The station was founded on January 29, 1995. Broadcasts were originally hosted from a barn located on a cow pasture.

Subchannels
The station's digital signal is multiplexed:

See also
Channel 10 branded TV stations in the United States
Channel 33 digital TV stations in the United States
Channel 49 virtual TV stations in the United States

References

External links
WRXY website
CTN website

Television channels and stations established in 1995
RXY-TV
1995 establishments in Florida
Christian Television Network affiliates